The Sisodia clan of Mewar, also called the "House of Mewar", is a Rajput clan that ruled the Kingdom of Mewar, later called the Udaipur State under the British Raj. The dynasty traces its ancestry back to Rahapa, a son of the Guhila king Ranasimha. Hammir Singh, a scion of this branch family of the Guhilas, re-established the Kingdom of Mewar after defeating the Tughluq sultans of Delhi.

List of Maharanas

See also

Udaipur State
List of Indian monarchs

References

Bibliography

External links

Mewar dynasty
Suryavansha
Rajput rulers